David Owain Maurice Charles is a Professor of Philosophy and Classics at Yale University.  He has previously been Colin Prestige Fellow, and Professor of Philosophy at Oriel College, Oxford, and CUF Lecturer in Philosophy, Faculty of Philosophy, Oxford University, and has been a Visiting Professor at the University of California at Los Angeles and at Rutgers University, New Jersey.

Charles holds a doctorate (D.Phil.) in philosophy from Oxford University. His research interests lie in issues concerning meaning, definition and practical skill and interconnections between philosophy and psychiatry. He has published on Greek philosophy and on contemporary philosophy of mind and metaphysics.

Publications 

 Aristotle's Philosophy of Action (1984)
 (co-editor with Kathleen Lennon) Reduction, Explanation and Realism (1992)
 (co-editor with Theodore Scaltsas and Mary Louise Gill) Unity, Identity and Explanation  in Aristotle’s Metaphysics (1994)
 Aristotle on Meaning and Essence (2000)
 (co-editor with Michael Frede) Aristotle’s Metaphysics Book Lambda, (2000)
 (co-editor with William Child) Wittgensteinian themes: essays in honour of David Pears   (2001)
 (editor) Definition in Greek Philosophy (2010)

References 

20th-century British non-fiction writers
20th-century British philosophers
20th-century essayists
20th-century Welsh writers
21st-century British non-fiction writers
21st-century British philosophers
21st-century essayists
21st-century Welsh writers
Action theorists
Analytic philosophers
Aristotelian philosophers
British logicians
British male essayists
British philosophers
British scholars of ancient Greek philosophy
Epistemologists
Fellows of Oriel College, Oxford
Historians of philosophy
History of logic
Lecturers
Living people
Metaphysicians
Metaphysics writers
Ontologists
Philosophers of language
Philosophers of logic
Philosophers of mind
Philosophers of psychology
Philosophers of social science
Philosophy academics
Welsh essayists
Welsh male non-fiction writers
Welsh philosophers
Wittgensteinian philosophers
Year of birth missing (living people)